Gary Parsonage (born 2 June 1963) is a British equestrian. He competed in the team eventing at the 1996 Summer Olympics.

References

External links
 

1963 births
Living people
British male equestrians
Olympic equestrians of Great Britain
Equestrians at the 1996 Summer Olympics
Sportspeople from Chester